The 1988 California Angels season involved the Angels finishing 4th in the American League West with a record of 75 wins and 87 losses. The Angels closed out the year by losing twelve games in a row, longest in team history; when they lost on Opening Day the next year, it unofficially served as a thirteen-game streak. This record was broken 34 years later.

Offseason
September 23, 1987: Doug DeCinces was released by the California Angels.
October 30, 1987: Don Sutton was released by the California Angels.
December 1, 1987: Chili Davis signed as a free agent with the California Angels.
December 3, 1987: Greg Minton was signed as a free agent with the California Angels.

Regular season

Opening Day starters
 Bob Boone
 Chili Davis
 Brian Downing
 Jack Howell
 Wally Joyner
 Kirk McCaskill
 Mark McLemore
 Johnny Ray
 Dick Schofield
 Devon White

Season standings

Record vs. opponents

Notable Transactions
May 9, 1988: Bill Buckner was released by the California Angels.
June 1, 1988: Jim Abbott was drafted by the California Angels in the 1st round (8th pick) of the 1988 amateur draft. Player signed August 3, 1988.

Roster

Player stats

Batting

Starters by position
Note: Pos = Position; G = Games played; AB = At bats; H = Hits; Avg. = Batting average; HR = Home runs; RBI = Runs batted in

Other batters
Note: G = Games played; AB = At bats; H = Hits; Avg. = Batting average; HR = Home runs; RBI = Runs batted in

Pitching

Starting pitchers
Note: G = Games pitched; IP = Innings pitched; W = Wins; L = Losses; ERA = Earned run average; SO = Strikeouts

Other pitchers
Note: G = Games pitched; IP = Innings pitched; W = Wins; L = Losses; ERA = Earned run average; SO = Strikeouts

Relief pitchers
Note: G = Games pitched; W = Wins; L = Losses; SV = Saves; ERA = Earned run average; SO = Strikeouts

Farm system

References

1988 California Angels at Baseball Reference
1988 California Angels  at Baseball Almanac

Los Angeles Angels seasons
Los
Los